Eudonia interlinealis is a species of moth in the family Crambidae. It is found on the Azores.

The wingspan is about 16 mm. The forewings are ochreous-grey with darker grey markings. The hindwings are shining whitish grey and darker along the margin.

References

Moths described in 1905
Eudonia